Deh Mandro was Pakistan's first satellite earth station, located about 50 km north of Karachi. It was established in 1972 and operated by the Pakistan Telegraph & Telephone (PT&T) Department. It provided a 24-hour direct telecommunication link through the Intelsat III F-3.

Its foundation stone was laid by the then-President of Pakistan Yahya Khan on 28 June 1970. Its formal inauguration was carried out by the then-Prime Minister Zulfiqar Ali Bhutto on 25 March 1974. In 1975, the International Telecommunications Satellite Organization (ITSO) gave the Deh Mandro, 'No. 1' rating for the 100% uninterrupted functioning of the station. The station was responsible for overseas communication of telephone, telex services as well as for television. Pakistan, through the station was directly connected with the US, Italy, the UK, China, Japan, Kuwait, Bahrain, and Hong Kong.

It was installed by a Canadian Company RCA. It faced to 60 degree east Intelsat satellite. The first call was established between Canada and Lahore, in the afternoon on 16 December 1972. Before that different HF (High Frequency) wireless stations were in use, such as Pipri/Ghagar, K.T (Karachi-Transmitter)/MRC (Malir receiving Station), Talnor/Wani at Rawalpindi. Its first in-charge (Director) was A.N. Faizi (Abdu Nusar Faizi). Communication system further enhanced through i. Pak-UAE Analogue Submarine Cable system (1177 km/Analogue), ii. SEA-ME-WE-3, iii. SEA-ME-WE-4 (South East Asia-Middle East-Western Europe) systems.

External links
 http://wikimapia.org/652506/Dehmandro-Satellite-Earth-Station
 http://www.getamap.net/maps/pakistan/sindh/_dehmandro/

References 

Telecommunications companies of Pakistan
1972 establishments in Pakistan